Bratříčku, zavírej vrátka (English: Close the Gate, Little Brother) is the debut album by Karel Kryl, issued in Czechoslovakia by Panton in 1969. The album was recorded in Ostrava between 1967-1968. It was produced by Jiří Černý, who also wrote the liner notes. The cover features photography by Josef Koudelka.

Track listing 
"Bratříčku, zavírej vrátka" – 2:15
"Král a klaun" – 4:15
"Salome" – 2:50
"Veličenstvo kat" – 4:50
"Důchodce" – 1:45
"Anděl" – 3:05
"Morituri te salutant" – 3:15
"Pieta" – 3:25
"Podivná ruleta" – 4:40
"Znamení doby" – 2:40
"Píseň Neznámého vojína" – 2:45
"Nevidomá dívka" – 4:30
"Jeřabiny" – 1:45
"Pasážová revolta" – 2:45

References

1969 albums
Karel Kryl albums